The men's long jump at the 2019 World Athletics Championships was held at the Khalifa International Stadium in Doha from 27 to 28 September 2019.

Summary
The last qualifier to the final was Tajay Gayle with a 7.89m.  In the final, as the third jumper on the runway, Gayle jumped a personal best 8.46m to take the lead.  No other jumper would beat that mark.  World leader Juan Miguel Echevarría jumped 8.25m while giving up the entire 20cm width of the board.  His jump was bettered by Jeff Henderson with an 8.28m three jumpers later.  In the third round, Echevarría improved to 8.34m.  And three jumpers later, Henderson improved to 8.39m.  That decided the other medalists.  In the fourth round, Gayle improved to  +0.5.  Not only did it win the competition, it leapfrogged him into the #11 position of all time.  Just two months earlier in the season, Gayle had made a huge improvement in his personal best to 8.32m, which put him into a tie for #15 of all time.

Records
Before the competition records were as follows:

Qualification standard
The standard to qualify automatically for entry was 8.17 m.

Schedule
The event schedule, in local time (UTC+3), was as follows:

Results

Qualification
The qualification round will take place on 27 September, in two groups, both starting at 16:30. Athletes attaining a mark of at least 8.15 metres ( Q ) or at least the 12 best performers ( q ) will qualify for the final.

Final
The final was started on 28 September at 20:40.

References

Long jump
Long jump at the World Athletics Championships